Zaloška Gorica is a settlement in the Municipality of Žalec in east-central Slovenia. The area is part of the traditional region of Styria. The municipality is now included in the Savinja Statistical Region.

The A1 motorway crosses the territory of the settlement south of the settlement core. When it was being built in 1988, the 17th-century Zalog Mansion, which had fallen into disrepair after the Second World War, was demolished. The site with what remains of a park associated with the estate is included in the Slovenian Ministry of Culture register of national heritage.

Name
The name of the settlement was changed from Gorica to Zaloška Gorica in 1953.

References

External links
Zaloška Gorica at Geopedia

Populated places in the Municipality of Žalec